Protect and Survive was a public information campaign on civil defence. Produced by the British government between 1974 and 1980, it intended to advise the public on how to protect themselves during a nuclear attack. The campaign comprised a pamphlet, newspaper advertisements, radio broadcasts, and public information films. The series had originally been intended for distribution only in the event of dire national emergency, but provoked such intense public interest that the pamphlet was published, in slightly amended form, in 1980. Due to its controversial subject, and the nature of its publication, the cultural impact of Protect and Survive was greater and longer-lasting than most public information campaigns.

Origins
Protect and Survive had its origins in civil defence leaflets dating back to 1938, titled The Protection of Your Home Against Air Raids. These advised the homeowner on what to do in the event of air attack. This evolved as the nature of warfare and geopolitics changed, with the pamphlets updated first into The Hydrogen Bomb in 1957, and later into Advising the Householder on Protection against Nuclear Attack in 1963. This document, of which 500,000 copies were made, garnered considerable public and government criticism when it was first released for its lack of explanations or conveyance of the reasoning behind the advice that was given.  The Estimates Committee were similarly bemused by the advice, calling for its withdrawal.  Civil defence personnel were summoned to House of Commons meetings in which they responded to all the points of criticism that were raised. The 1963 pamphlet was then accompanied by a series of public information films produced in 1964, called Civil Defence Information Bulletins. These films were intended to be broadcast in a state of emergency. Pamphlets similar to those prepared in 1963 briefly appeared in Peter Watkins' controversial 1965 BBC docudrama The War Game, in a scene where they were distributed to people's homes. The 1964 bulletins were not depicted in the film.

The fallout radiation advice in Protect and Survive was based on 1960s fallout shelter experiments summarised by Daniel T. Jones of the Home Office Scientific Advisory Branch in his report, The Protection Against Fallout Radiation Afforded by Core Shelters in a Typical British House which was published in Protective Structures for Civilian Populations, Proceedings of the Symposium held at Washington, D.C., 19–23 April 1965, by the Subcommittee on Protective Structures, Advisory Committee on Civil Defense, US National Academy of Sciences, National Research Council. The fallout radiation was represented by measurements of the penetration of cobalt-60 gamma radiation, which has a high mean energy of 1.25 MeV (two gamma rays, 1.17 and 1.33 MeV). This is considerably more penetrating than the mean 0.7 MeV of fallout gamma rays. Therefore, the actual protection given against real nuclear weapon fallout would be far greater than that afforded in the peacetime cobalt-60 shielding measurements.

Wartime Broadcasting Service

During the early 1970s, the BBC and the Home Office produced a radio script advising the public of what to do in the event of nuclear attack. This was eventually published in October 2008 on the BBC's website, with the full correspondence made available to the public via The National Archives. The script used very similar language and style to the later Protect and Survive series. In particular, it emphasised the need for citizens to remain in their homes, and not to try to evacuate elsewhere.

During the exchange of correspondence between the BBC and various government departments, several letters seem to suggest that a booklet for public consumption was already being discussed. In a letter from the Central Office of Information, dated 12 March 1974, a request for information from The Home Office about a proposed booklet read as follows:

This was replied to on 15 March 1974 by the Home Office, clearly stating that such a booklet was being produced, and that they were also targeting the same information at television:

Publication of the pamphlet

Protect and Survive was formally published in May 1980, but had come to the public's attention before that via a series of articles in The Times newspaper in January 1980. This wave of interest had been preceded by numerous letters to The Times in December 1979 questioning what Civil Defence arrangements were in place in the UK.

This was then followed by a Times leader on 19 January 1980 which noted that: "In Britain, a Home Office booklet "Protect and Survive" remains unavailable."  Following this unexpected publicity for Protect and Survive, The Minister of State at the Home Office, Leon Brittan, responding on the subject in the House of Commons on 20 February 1980 said that:

The Minister then went on to say the Home Office had received over 200 letters from the public on civil defence. Following the press and parliamentary focus on Protect and Survive, as well as an episode of the BBC's Newsnight programme which focused on the campaign, the government chose to publish the Protect and Survive booklet in May 1980.

Political reaction
Organizations such as the Campaign for Nuclear Disarmament protested that the pamphlet, by popularising the idea that a nuclear war could be survived, made such a war more likely. The protest organisations published and sold large numbers of copies of the pamphlet, considering that widespread reading of the pamphlet could only discredit the government's policy. Counter-pamphlets such as "Protest and Survive" by E P Thompson and "Civil Defence, whose Defence" by the Disarmament Information Group replied to the pamphlet's arguments.

Media
The purpose of the Protect and Survive scheme was to provide members of the British public with instructions, primarily via broadcast media, on how to protect themselves and survive a nuclear attack. The broadcasts were to be supplemented by a booklet, which was to act an aide-memoire for householders; despite the booklet's later prominence in British culture, the campaign was originally conceived as being broadcast-led, with the booklet confirmed later. The scheme was not intended to be made public during peacetime, and would only have been broadcast if a nuclear attack was deemed likely by the Government during an international crisis. The information detailed a series of steps recommended to be undertaken by British civilians to improve their chances of survival in the event of a nuclear strike on the United Kingdom.

Print
The Protect and Survive booklet was prepared in 1976, and some 2,000 copies were printed and secretly issued to chief executives of local authorities and senior police officers. Its existence having been brought to public attention by the Times, a slightly revised edition of the booklet was printed in 1980, and made available through Stationery Office bookshops. During peacetime, the booklet was priced at 50 pence, but would be widely distributed freely to all households in the United Kingdom if the threat of a nuclear attack increased. This was complemented in 1981 by two booklets regarding the construction of fallout shelters: Domestic Nuclear Shelters, with techniques for building a home shelter, and Domestic Nuclear Shelters – Technical Guidance, for the design and construction of long-term and permanent shelters, some of which involved elaborate designs.

The contents of the booklets would also be printed in national newspapers if the risk of nuclear attack increased.

In response to extensive criticism of Protect and Survive, Civil Defence: Why We Need It was also printed in November 1981 by the Home Office, which attempted to defend the reasons for civil defence.

Television
 Protect and Survive was adapted for television as a series of twenty short public information films. The films were classified, intended for transmission on all television channels if the government determined that nuclear attack was likely within 72 hours. However, recordings leaked to CND and the BBC, who broadcast excerpts from them on Panorama on 10 March 1980, shortly after the Soviet invasion of Afghanistan.

The films were produced by Richard Taylor Cartoons, who also produced the Charley Says child safety films and children's animation Crystal Tipps and Alistair. They are similar in content to the booklets, detailing the same instructions using voice-over narration, sound effects, and a combination of simple stop-motion and illustrated animation. Patrick Allen was chosen to narrate. His voiceover would later be described as "the calm, clipped vowels of a male announcer, advising how to build shelters, avoid fallout, and wrap up your dead loved ones in polythene, bury them, and tag their bodies." He would later parody the recordings for Frankie Goes To Hollywood's song "Two Tribes", announcing "Mine is the last voice you will ever hear. Do not be alarmed".

Each episode concluded with a distinctive electronic musical phrase composed by the BBC Radiophonic Workshop's Roger Limb. It featured two high- and low-pitched melodies coming together "like people". So great was the secrecy around production that Limb handed over his tapes to producer Bruce Allen in an alley.

List of episodes

Nuclear Explosions Explained (1:35) Effects of atomic weapons
The Warnings (2:53) Attack, fall-out and all-clear warnings
What to Do When the Warnings Sound (2:28) "Immediate action" drill
Stay at Home (1:40) Techniques for sheltering in place
Choosing a Fall-out Room (2:06) Choosing a safe room
Refuges (3:54) Building an "inner refuge"
Materials to Use for Your Fall-out Room and Refuge (1:55) Radiation shielding materials
Make Your Fall-out Room and Refuge Now (4:42) Preparing for an attack
What to Put in Your Fall-out Room (3:03) Essential supplies
Action After Warnings (4:13) Detailed "immediate action" drill
Water and Food (2:41) Provisions for 14 days
Sanitation (1:33) Makeshift toilet arrangements
Fire Precautions (2:02) Expedient firefighting techniques
The Importance of Your Radio (1:20) Portable radio as a vital aid
Life Under Fall-out Conditions (2:51) Survival during an attack
What to Do After an Attack (2:29) Post-attack actions
Sanitation Care (2:40) Essential hygiene
Water Consumption (1:28) Safeguarding and rationing water
Food Consumption (1:40) Rationing food
Casualties (1:27) Expedient casualty care and mortuary actions

Radio
A collection of recordings for radio transmission were produced as part of the programme. These differ slightly from the films in that the voice was provided not by Patrick Allen, but by both male and female voices. In addition, certain portions of the instructional copy are changed slightly. While it has been speculated that a small portion of these recordings is heard in Threads, during the scene where the character of Bill Kemp is discussing removing internal doors to use for their shelter, this is in fact re-recorded by an actor.

Cultural impact
The programme created a substantial impact upon the popular culture of the UK of the early 1980s, most notably in music. Rock band Jethro Tull recorded a song called "Protect and Survive" on their 1980 album A, while the hardcore punk/D-beat band Discharge recorded the track "Protest and Survive", named after E. P. Thompson's anti-nuclear manifesto, for their 1982 album Hear Nothing See Nothing Say Nothing. The actor Patrick Allen, who narrated the associated public information films, recreated this narration for the 1984 number one single, "Two Tribes", by Frankie Goes To Hollywood. Irish folk band The Dubliners recorded a song called “Protect and Survive” on their 1987 record, 25 Years Celebration. Heavy metal band Wolfsbane's self-titled 1994 album contains a song called "Protect and Survive". More recently, the campaign's logo can be seen turned sideways on the cover of the 1997 "Karma Police" single by Radiohead. And London post-rock band Public Service Broadcasting recorded a track "Protect and Survive" using samples from the Roger Limb score set over a drum heavy track with live performances incorporating visual elements taken from the government information film.

In print, Raymond Briggs' graphic novel When the Wind Blows (later adapted as an animated film, radio and stage play) obliquely mentions various aspects of the Protect and Survive programme, and the BBC play Threads featured four of the series' films: Stay at Home, Make Your Fall-out Room and Refuge Now, Action After Warnings and Casualties. The leaflet series became the subject of detailed and scholarly criticism from anti-nuclear authors (such as E. P. Thompson), who produced a counterargument entitled Protest and Survive. Louise Lawrence's children's novel Children of the Dust refers to one of the inner refuge designs mentioned in the leaflets, and to the public information films and radio tapes.

On television, Protect and Survive was thoroughly lampooned in the television series "The Young Ones" episode "Bomb." The Protect and Survive booklet appears on-screen during the episode, as characters hide ineffectively under clothed tables and paint themselves white to deflect the blast; parodying its instructions on creating an "inner refuge" and whitewashing one's windows, respectively. Also, in the Spooks episode "Nuclear Strike," the character Malcolm is seen viewing one of the information videos.

In a Channel 4 poll of the 100 scariest moments, Protect and Survive came 89th, just above Tod Browning's 1931 Dracula. The explanation for this, as explained by some celebrities on the show, was because of the films' grim instructions, unsettling music and the fact that "a nuclear war was one of the most disastrous things that could happen".

The full version of Protect and Survive is shown on a loop underground at the Hack Green Secret Nuclear Bunker in Cheshire, and the Kelvedon Hatch Secret Nuclear Bunker in Essex. Other copies are shown on loops at the Imperial War Museums in London and Manchester.

See also
Transition to war
Fallout Protection
Preparing for Emergencies
Nuclear weapons and the United Kingdom
Survival Under Atomic Attack
Duck and Cover (film)
The War Game (film)
Threads (film)
List of books about nuclear issues
List of films about nuclear issues
Protect and Survive (Doctor Who audio drama)
Om kriget kommer

References

External links
Protect and Survive at the Imperial War Museum
Protect and Survive – Action After Warnings. Video from the National Archive
Protect and Survive – Casualties. Video from the National Archive
Advising The Householder: a series of Public Information Films that were a precursor to Protect and Survive 
Protect and Survive 1980 pamphlet

Cold War documents
British animated films
Social guidance films
Films about nuclear war and weapons
Emergency management in the United Kingdom
Public information films
Cold War history of the United Kingdom
1964 films
1960s educational films
1960s animated films
1970s educational films
1980s educational films
1970s animated films
1980s animated films
1964 animated films
1960s British films
1970s British films
1980s British films
British educational films